William Raymond Pixley (1907 in Lynden, Washington – 30 August 1936 in Hammond, Indiana) was an American racecar driver. Primarily a sprint car driver, he drove in the 1936 Indianapolis 500 for Clarence Felker in a Miller that had once sported a V16 engine but at the time was powered by a Miller four-cylinder. It would be his only Championship Car start as he was killed in August of that year in a crash at Roby Speedway in Hammond, Indiana.

Indy 500 results

References

Racing drivers who died while racing
Indianapolis 500 drivers
Sports deaths in Indiana
1907 births
1936 deaths
Racing drivers from Washington (state)